The Blooms of Banjeli is a Togolese short documentary film directed by Carlyn Saltman. The 29-minute film includes footage from 1914 not released until 1986 or 1987. It documents the town of Banjeli, from its iron smelting technology to local rituals and sexual prohibitions.

References

External links
 
 

1986 films
Togolese films
1980s short documentary films
1986 documentary films
1914 films
Economy of Togo
Togolese culture
Films set in Togo